Punk Goes Pop Volume 03. is the tenth compilation album released from the Punk Goes... series created by Fearless Records and the third installment in the Punk Goes Pop franchise to feature various post-hardcore, metalcore and alternative rock bands covering mainstream pop songs. It was released on November 2, 2010. The album was also released with a bonus CD sampler which contains songs by various bands from the Rise and Fearless record labels. Additionally Japan's edition of the album contains two extra bonus tracks by Japanese bands covering pop songs. The album sold 18,000 copies.

Track listing
A list of confirmed songs and artists was released on August 25, 2010 by Alternative Press.

Japanese Edition
The Japanese version contains the following two bonus tracks.

Bonus CD
"Epiphany" – The Word Alive (Fearless Records)
"Smokahontas" – Attack Attack! (Rise Records)
"Come Back to Me" – Amely (Fearless Records)
"We Are Life" – Emarosa (Rise Records)
"Creatures" – Motionless in White (Fearless Records)
"Surroundings" – My Ticket Home (Rise Records)
"I'm Not Dead Yet" – For All Those Sleeping (Fearless Records)
"Lost in Existence" – Scarlett O'Hara (Rise Records)
"Letters and Love Notes" - Go Radio (Fearless Records)
"Behind Locked Doors" - Ten After Two (Rise Records)

References

Covers albums
Punk Goes series
2010 compilation albums